Salix sessilifolia is a species of willow known by the common name northwest sandbar willow. It is native to the west coast of North America from British Columbia and the US states of Washington and Oregon. It grows on sandy and gravelly riverbanks, floodplains, and sandbars.

Salix sessilifolia Nutt. is a shrub growing , exceptionally  in height, sometimes forming colonial thickets of clones by sprouting repeatedly from its root system.

References

External links

Jepson Manual Treatment
Photo gallery

sessilifolia
Flora of Oregon
Flora of British Columbia
Flora of Washington (state)
Plants described in 1842
Flora without expected TNC conservation status